In association football, the panenka is a technique used while taking a penalty kick in which the taker, instead of kicking the ball to the left or right of the goalkeeper, gives a light touch underneath the ball, causing it to rise and fall within the centre of the goal, deceiving the goalkeeper who is counted on by the taker to have guessed a side and committed to a dive away from the centre.

The technique was invented by Czech player Antonín Panenka, who introduced it to the world in the UEFA Euro 1976 final in Belgrade, when he beat West German goalkeeper Sepp Maier to claim the title for the Czechoslovakia national team. After its much publicised debut in the tournament, the Panenka kick has been used on rare occasions and mostly by highly respected players who can deal with the consequences of missing such an attempt. 

Originally, in Czech language the kick is called Vršovický dloubák—a reference to the Prague district of Vršovice, where Panenka's home club Bohemians is based.

This style of penalty kick is also called Il cucchiaio ("the spoon") in Italy, cavadinha ("little dig") in Brazil and penal picado ("poked penalty kick") in Argentina and elsewhere in South America.

Technique 
The aim of the technique is not to chip the ball over the goalkeeper, but to take advantage of the fact that many goalkeepers will dive to either side of the goal in anticipation, rather than waiting to see in which direction the ball is going. It is a very risky technique, because the subtle touch on the ball gives it a very slow speed, thus allowing the goalkeeper to move back from where they jumped, or even to simply remain in the same spot and wait for the ball to fall easily into their hands. In addition, the subtle touch is most easily applied by a taker who slows down as he or she is about to strike the ball, making it possible for the goalkeeper to recognize what the taker is intending. The move is known for only being used by confident penalty takers who dare to risk missing the kick. Some players that have used the Panenka kick have been criticized by the specialized media or their team's members and supporters, especially if they miss it.

According to studies, a Panenka has a lower scoring probability over placement or power, though it is alleged that if successful, a Panenka's psychological impact on the opposite team may be profound, which may be why penalty takers elect to use it. At the penalty shootout in Italy's Game against England at the Euro 2012, Andrea Pirlo purposefully adopted a Panenka in order to deliver a "psychological blow" to England. Antonín Panenka, though, saw the penalty as a reflection of his own personality.

History

The original penalty 

Antonín Panenka came to international prominence playing for Czechoslovakia in the 1976 European Championship; Czechoslovakia reached the final, where they faced West Germany. After extra time, the result was 2–2, and so the first penalty shootout in a European Championships final ensued. The first seven kicks were converted, until West Germany's fourth penalty taker, Uli Hoeneß, ballooned his shot over the bar. With the score 4–3, Panenka stepped up to take the fifth Czechoslovakian penalty, to win the match under immense pressure. He feigned shooting to the side of the goal, causing West German goalkeeper Sepp Maier to dive to his left, and then gently chipped the ball into the middle of the net. The perceived impudence of the shot, in addition to its success, led a watching French journalist to dub Panenka "a poet", and his winning kick is one of the most famous ever, making Panenka's name synonymous with that particular style of penalty kick. After the game, Panenka was told that he could have been punished if he missed, as it may have been seen as disrespecting the Communist system in place at the time in his home country. On viewing the penalty Pelé described Panenka as being "either a genius or a madman".

Since 1976 

As well as winning the 1976 European Championship, Panenka helped Czechoslovakia come third in the 1980 tournament, after scoring once again in a 9–8 penalty shootout win. In the finals of the 1982 World Cup, Panenka scored twice with penalties, but these were the only Czechoslovakian goals, and the team did not progress beyond the first group stage.

The Panenka penalty has since been successfully performed by many other players in a wide range of competitions.  Only a small number of these have been, like Panenka's original, in major cup finals – Zinedine Zidane in the 2006 FIFA World Cup Final, Alexis Sánchez in the 2015 Copa América Final, and Odsonne Édouard in the 2020 Scottish Cup final. Examples of Panenkas outside finals include Francesco Totti for Italy in their Euro 2000 semi-final shoot-out against the Netherlands, Sebastián Abreu for Uruguay in their 2010 FIFA World Cup quarter-final shoot-out against Ghana, Andrea Pirlo for Italy in their Euro 2012 quarter-final shoot-out against England, Knowledge Musona used it against Eswatini national football team on 26 March 2016 in AFCON qualifiers, Lionel Messi in a UEFA Champions League game for Paris Saint-Germain against RB Leipzig in 2021, and Karim Benzema for Real Madrid against Manchester City in a UEFA Champions League semi-final in 2022. 

As with all penalty attempts, not every one is successful. In the 2019 A-League Grand Final Perth Glory player Brendon Santalab, who had scored multiple Panenka penalties previously in his career, played his last game as a professional. The match ended in a penalty shootout between Sydney FC and Santalab's club Perth Glory. With the score at 3 to 1 in favour of Sydney FC, Santalab took Perth's third penalty, attempting a Panenka, but Sydney FC goalkeeper Andrew Redmayne was expecting it. The keeper stood upright and easily saved the weak kick. Sydney FC scored their next penalty, winning the shootout and the A-League Championship 4 to 1. Former England captain Gary Lineker infamously failed a Panenka which at the time, would have put him level with Bobby Charlton for the England team's top scorer, the missed penalty instead leaving him one goal behind on 48 for the rest of his career.

Moroccan right-back Achraf Hakimi hit a successful panenka against Spanish goalkeeper Unai Simon during the 2022 FIFA World Cup propelling Morocco into the quarter-finals for the first time in their history.

References 

Kick (association football)
Association football terminology
Association football skills
UEFA Euro 1976
1976 introductions